Borgo Lares is a comune (municipality) in the Province of Trentino in the Italian region Trentino-Alto Adige/Südtirol.

It was established on 1 January 2016 by the merger of the municipalities of Bolbeno and Zuclo.

References

Cities and towns in Trentino-Alto Adige/Südtirol